Siphonaria naufragum is a species of air-breathing sea snail, or false limpet, a marine heterobranch gastropod mollusc in the family Siphonariidae.

Distribution
It is found in intertidal zones of rocky shores within Florida, the Florida Keys, and the Gulf of Mexico.

Taxonomic status
Siphonaria naufragum was initially thought to be a widespread species with an amphiatlantic distribution, Siphonaria pectinata (Linnaeus, 1758). A 2015 molecular study clearly distinguished three lineages with no apparent connectivity. These lineages are now treated as three separate species. The S. pectinata is restricted to the eastern Atlantic and Mediterranean, S. naufragum (Stearns, 1872) from Florida (and Keys) and the Gulf of Mexico, and S. placentula Menke, 1853 from the Cape Verde Archipelago.

Gallery

References

External links
 Stearns, R. E. C. (1872). Descriptions of new species of marine mollusks from the coast of Florida. Proceedings of the Boston Society of Natural History. 15: 21-24

Siphonariidae
Gastropods described in 1872
Biota of the Gulf of Mexico
Molluscs of the United States